William Howard Wriggins (February 14, 1918 – August 30, 2008) was a US diplomat, author and academic who served as the United States ambassador to Sri Lanka and the Maldives from 1977 until 1979. His interest in the study of Sri Lanka spanned over fifty years of professional and academic work.

Early life 
He received degrees from Dartmouth College, the University of Chicago and Yale University.

He temporarily left his academic studies for four years during World War II in order to work with the American Friends Service Committee (AFSC) on their relief missions in Portugal, France, North Africa and Spain. Wriggins continued to work with the AFSC after the war. He lived for a time in the Gaza Strip while working for the AFSC in its relief efforts there.

Career 
Much of Wriggins academic studies and professional career centered on the study of South Asia, specifically Sri Lanka. He wrote numerous books and other works on the study of Sri Lanka.  He published his first book, Ceylon: Dilemmas of a New Nation, in 1960. He later co-authored a biography of former Sri Lankan President Junius Richard Jayewardene with K. M. de Silva, a Professor Emeritus of History at the University of Ceylon.

Wriggins became a Professor of political science and international relations at Columbia University in New York City. His studies at Columbia focused on Sri Lanka and he was considered one of the foremost scholars of Sri Lankan studies in the United States.

Wriggins was working as a professor at Columbia University when U.S. President Jimmy Carter nominated him to be ambassador to Sri Lanka and the Maldives in 1977. He took a leave of absence from the school in order to serve as ambassador.

He returned to Columbia University following the end of his diplomatic posting in 1979. He later became the director of Columbia University's Southern Asian Institute. Wriggins was a Bryce Professor of International Relations, Emeritus, at Columbia University at the time of his death in 2008.

Death 
William Howard Wriggins died on August 30, 2008, in Hanover, New Hampshire. He was survived by his wife, Sally Hovey Wriggins, three children, and six grandchildren.

Works authored 
 Ceylon: Dilemmas of a New Nation - 1960
 J.R. Jayewardene of Sri Lanka: A Political Biography - 1988

References 

1918 births
2008 deaths
Ambassadors of the United States to Sri Lanka
Ambassadors of the United States to the Maldives
Columbia University faculty
Dartmouth College alumni
University of Chicago alumni
Yale University alumni
Asian studies
20th-century American diplomats